Carbolabs, Inc., is an American chemistry company specializing in reactions utilizing phosgene, founded by Joe Karabinos in 1967.  Originally located in the basement of his home in Bethany, Connecticut, it wasn't until the following year that the business was moved into its own dedicated building. The company was purchased by Sigma Aldrich in 1998. In 2008 operations at the Bethany site were discontinued and were subsequently moved to the Sheboygan Falls, Wisconsin Sigma Aldrich manufacturing facility. Carbolabs uses phosgene to produce a wide array of chemicals including isocyanates, chloroformates, and isonitriles, although some reactions not involving phosgene such as the production of the fluorinating reagent DAST are also part of their established chemistries. As a subsidiary of Sigma Aldrich, a number of Aldrich products still bear "A Carbolabs Product" on their label.

References

External links
 Official website

Merck Group
Specialty chemical companies
Chemical companies of the United States
Chemical companies established in 1967
1967 establishments in Connecticut
1998 mergers and acquisitions